John George Brown (May 8, 1900 – November 11, 1958) was an Ontario politician. He was elected to the Ontario legislature as the Ontario Liberal Party Member of Provincial Parliament for Waterloo North in the 1948 provincial election.

Brown ran for his party's leadership in the 1950 Liberal leadership convention. He placed third in a field of eight candidates and remaining until the third and final ballot.

He only served in the legislature for a single term, until the 1951 provincial election. He died suddenly in hospital in 1958.

References

Ontario Liberal Party MPPs
1900 births
1958 deaths